Robert H. Dennis Sr. (1846 - April 17, 1900) was a teacher and state legislator in Florida. In 1875 he represented Jackson County, Florida in the Florida House of Representatives.

He was born in Pennsylvania. He was elected to the state house along with Benjamin F. Livingston and William J. Purman.

See also
African-American officeholders during and following the Reconstruction era

References

1846 births
1900 deaths
Members of the Florida House of Representatives
African-American politicians during the Reconstruction Era